Glyptotendipes meridionalis is a species of non-biting midge in the genus Glyptotendipes found in Oklahoma and Texas.

Genbank genetic sequence

References

Chironomidae